Adit Sopo Jarwo is an Indonesian animated television series. Produced by MD Animation, the series was launched on 27 January 2014 on MNCTV. It has also aired on Global TV.

The show was originally named Adit & Sopo Jarwo, but on 20 March 2017 it was renamed Adit Sopo Jarwo and moved to Trans TV. On 10 September 2017, it resumed broadcast on MNCTV. On 9 April 2021, Adit Sopo Jarwo moved to RTV.

So Adit And Adel Is A Famous Children In Indonesia, Adel Born On 2012 Or 2013... 

So Adit And Adel Is A Famous Children In Indonesia, Adel Born On 2012 Or 2013... 

Adit Born On 2002, 20 Years Ago... ==Premise==
The show revolves around the adventures of a boy named Adit and his friends Dennis, Mitha, Ucup and Devi, and little sister Adel. Adit is the driving force of the group, pushing his companions to be positive and righteous. However, they often experience disagreements with two adults, the large, lumbering, slow-witted Sopo and his diminutive, conniving boss, Jarwo.

A local administrative official, Haji Udin, mediates between Sopo, Jarwo and Adit, offering sage advice that restores calm.

Characters 

 Raditya "Adit" Saputra, The son of Pak Surya and Bu Amira and the older brother of Adel, a supporting main character in this story who is always speeding when riding a bicycle, he wearing a wristwatches on his right wrist and wearing a shoes. (born 2002), (born 23 March 1995, based on movie)
 Dennis, Adit's best friend, who is afraid of Jarwo (born 2007)
 Mita, Adit's female friend (born 2002)
 Devi, Adit's female friend (born 2003)
 Adelya, Adit's younger sister (born 2012), (born 16 June 2005, based on movie)
 Bu Amira Adit's mother (born 28 February 1971 (based on movie, Jakarta)
 Pak Surya, Adit's father (born 1978) (born 1970, born in Yogyakarta based on movie)
 Sopo, slow-witted, stocky and sometimes unemployed, he often accompanies Jarwo and sometimes works for Baba Chang (born 1983) (born in Brebes based on movie). In "Adit Sopo Jarwo : The Movie" he helps Adit to return to his parents
 Jarwo, short, conniving and sometimes unemployed, he works odd jobs and works for Baba Chang (born 1977). He often clashes with Adit, although sometimes cooperates with him. In "Adit Sopo Jarwo : The Movie" he help Adit to meet his parent.
 Pak Haji Udin, local neighborhood chief (RW), he frequently mediates problems posed by Sopo and Jarwo (born 1963) 
 Kang Ujang, meatball vendor who sometimes orders Sopo and Jarwo to wash dirty dishes to settle their debts. Kang Ujang has a Sundanese accent (born 1973)
 Pak Dasuki, Karet villager who gives jobs to Sopo and Jarwo (born 1973)
 Jarwis, Jarwo's twin brother, he is the opposite of Jarwo (born 1977)
 Pak Anas, bad-tempered villager from North Sumatra (born 1968)
 Baba Chang, ethnic Chinese man (born 1963)
 Li Mei, Baba Chang's daughter (born 1991) her dad gave Birth to her
 Madun, Adit's friend, a soccer player (born 2001)
 Ucup, a small boy, who is friendly with Adit and Sopo. Shown to usually talk very slowly and with unnecessary details, often quoting religious verses and ends it with suggestions to ask Haji Udin for confirmation. (born 2009)
 Mamat, Karet villager (Born 1988)
 Kipli, male friends of Adit, Dennis, Mita and Devi (born 2003)
 Somad, male friends of Adit, Dennis, Mita, and Devi (born 2003)
 Umi Salamah, Karet villagers, a dupe of cake orders that had eaten half by Jarwo and Sopo (born 1974)
 Bu Mina, owner of "Warteg Gaul" food-stall (born 1984)
 Kakek, elderly Karet villager, friend of Pak Dasuki (born 1950)
 Nenek, elderly resident of Karet (born 1950)  
 Bang Sanip, village security guard, father Ucup, real name Sanif Bin Abdul Kadir Hassan (born 1946)  
 Ringgo, a resident of Kampung Karet who has a strong physique but has a low voice and is autistic, often sleeps because he stays up late at night (born 1980) 
 Nia, Adit's friend (born 22 June 2003)
 Agi, Adit's friend (born 10 September 2000)
 Bang Irin

Guests 

 Madun
 Cherrybelle
 Jokowi
 BJ Habibie
 Armad Maulana
 Slank
 Budi Waeseso
 Raffi Ahmad (Adit Sopo Jarwo: The Movie)

List of episodes 
List of Adit Sopo Jarwo episodes
 Dompet Ayah Ketinggalan (Dad's Wallet Is Missing)
 Dompet Ayah Masih Ketinggalan (Dad's Wallet Is Still Missing)
 Tahu Sumedang Bikin Jarwo Meradang (Tahu Sumedang make Jarwo Inflamed)
 Gerobak Hilang Kang Ujang Bimbang (The Lost Cart, Kang Ujang Uncertain)
 Jarwo Curang Adit Menang (Jarwo Cheats, Adit Wins)
 Ada Madun Jarwo Manyun (Madun's Here, Jarwo's Annoyed)
 Adel Dimana (Where's Adel?)
 Kejutan Buat Jarwo (Surprise For Jarwo)
 Lomba Layangan bikin semua Melayang (Kite Competition makes Everyone Flying)
 Syukuran Dapet Kerjaan (Thanksgiving get Work)
 Ojek Payung Bikin Bingung (Umbrella Taxibike makes confusion)
 Delivery Order bikin Keder (Delivery Order makes confusion)
 Adit Flu Jarwo Yang Pilu (Adit caught Flu, Jarwo's Miserable)
 Service Antena Bikin Terlena (Antenna Service make Fallen out)
 Bunda Ngidam Bikin Geram (Mother's Cravings make Furious)
 Sahabat Sejati Takkan Pernah Mati (Best friend will never die)
 Mati Lampu Bergilir (Turning lights off)
 Motor Baru Bikin Haru (New Motorcycle makes emotion)
 Tugas Patroli Kayak Uji Nyali (The Patrol Job's is like a Guts Test)
 Tugas Ngasuh Bikin Rusuh (The Nurture Job's makes Riots)
 Kabar Burung Bikin Bingung (Rumors cause Confusion)
 Saudara Berkunjung Semua Tersanjung (Relatives visiting, all flattered)
 Sunatan Massal Jangan Asal (Mass Circumcision do not come home)
 Cherrybelle Datang Jarwo Senang (Cherrybelle Come, Jarwo Happy)
 Cinta Merekah di Kampung Berkah (The Broke Love in Berkah Village)
 Jarwo Ge-Er di Kampung Geger (Jarwo Big-headed in Rage Village)
 Ada Baba Chang Bang Jarwo Senang (There's Baba Chang, Jarwo Happy)
 Nganter Telur Siapa Tau Mujur (Deliver The Egg, Who Know Luck)
 Ketika Piknik Bikin Panik (When The Picnic makes Panic)
 Bemo Hilang Bang Jarwo Bimbang (The Lost Bemo, Jarwo Uncertain)
 Hadapi Tantangan Lewati Rintangan (Face The Challenge, Through the Obstacle)
 Demi Hemat Jadi Berkeringat (For The Sake being Sweaty)
 Latihan Wushu Yang Seru (Exciting Wushu exercises)
 Surat Cinta Punya Cerita (The Love's Letter got the story)
 Lomba Lari Bikin Wara-Wiri 
 Sopo Sakit Jarwo Menjerit (Sopo Sick, Jarwo Screamed)
 Salah Duga Karena Mangga (Mistaken because of Mangoes)
 Kelebihan Muatan Bikin Kewalahan (Overload of Overloading)
 Petak Umpet Bikin Mumet (Hide and Seek Makes Dizzy)
 Niat Bagus Jadi Pupus (Good Intentions to be Vanished)
 Adel Rindu Jarwo Sendu (Adel Longing, Jarwo Wistful)
 Keadaan Sulit Jangan Berkelit (Difficult circumstances do not dodge)
 Sopo Cuti Ringgo Beraksi (Sopo Leave, Ringgo in Action)
 Jarwoku Sayang Jarwoku Hilang (The Beloved Jarwo, The Lost Jarwo)
 Jaga Warung Jadi Repot Tak Terbendung (Keep the Stall so busy Unstoppable) 
 Pelangi Indah di Kampung Karet Berkah (The Beautiful Rainbow in Blessing Rubber Village)
 Sejuta Mangkok Sejuta Senyum (A Thousand bowl, A Thousand Smile)
 Bikin Tumpeng Enaknya Bareng-Bareng (Makes Tumpeng, Ease Together)
 Bakso Hilang Hikmahpun Datang (The Lost Bakso, The Wisdom Coming)
 Hadiah Untuk Ayah Ucup (The Gift For Father Ucup)
 Ngejar Tokek Jadi Bokek (Chase the gecko to be Broke)
 Penuh Usaha Buat Punya Sepeda (Full Efforts for got the Bicycle)
 Warga Menanam Semua Bergumam (Citizens Planting all mumble)
 Jarwo Terperangkap Jarwo Menatap (Jarwo trapped, Jarwo stared)
 Jangan Berisik Nanti Adel Terusik (Do Not Noisy, Later Adel was Disturbed)
 Kalang Kabut Jadi Takut (Frantically so Scared)
 Dari Sekedar Jadi Tersadar (Than Just Being Sober)
 Jarwo Telat Jarwo Hebat (Jarwo It's Too Late, Jarwo Was Great)
 Aksi Troli Menantang Nyali (The Trolley Action Challenging the Guts)
 Pahlawan Super Tak Perlu Minder (Superhero no need to Inferior)
 Harus Berani Karena Nurani (Must be brave for conscience)
 Adit mencari Dennis Sendiri (Adit for Dennis Alone)
 7 Hari 7 Aksi (7 Days Of Action)
 Jarwo Belang Adel Senang (Jarwo Striped, Adel Happy)
 Adit Pindah Dennis Susah (Adit Moved Dennis So Hard)
 Adel Terkunci Ayah Kena Sanksi (Adel Locked Inside, Dad Got the Sanctions)
 Bantu Bunda Dengan Lapang Dada (Help the mother with gracefully)
 Radio Butut Bikin Kalut (The Old Radio, Uncle Anas Worry)
 Jarwo Mengaku Semua Terharu (Jarwo Admitted all touched)
 Perang-Perangan Bikin Semua Senang (The War Game Makes Everyone Happy)
 Gara-Gara Truk Jarwo Ngantuk (Because Truck Jarwo Sleepy)
 Jaga Ayam Jadi Runyam (Keep the Chicken Makes Weird)
 Mangga segar Buat Anak Bugar (The Fresh Mango makes Children fit)
 Tegang Karena Ayam Panggang (Suspense because grilled Chicken)
 Ban Terbang Jadi Menantang (The Flying wheel to be Challenge)
 Di Rumah yang Penuh Berkah (Bless this House)
 Sampah Membludak Semua Meledak (Garbage booming, all exploded)
 Diet Tak Teratur Malah Jadi Tersungkur (Diet Irregular, Was Fell Down)
 Bikin Gerabah Jangan Gegabah (Make Pottery don't be Careless)
 Ayah Di Rumah Insya Allah Berkah (Father in The House Insya Allah Blessed)
 Adit Membantu Semua Setuju (Adit Helping, Everyone Agree)
 Apel Malang Buat Adel Senang (Malang Apple makes Adel Happy)
 Adit Memberi Semua Berbagi (Adit Giving Everyone Sharing)
 Salah Sangka di Hutan Kota (Mistaken in the Urban Forest)
 Eyang Datang Semua Senang (Grandparent Coming, Everyone Happy)
 Ayo Kuat Bisa Bikin Pesawat (Let's be Strong makes the Plane)
 Bikin Pesawat Semua Sepakat (Makes The Plane, All agree)
 Ada Laporan Langsung Tindakan (There is a Report, Then the Action)
 Latihan Upacara Bikin Semua Bangga (Ceremonial Practice, Makes All Proud)
 Bikin Demo Pake Bemo (Makes The Demo Used the Bemo)
 Jeruk Bali Jadi Kreasi (Jeruk Bali Makes the Creation)
 Inline Skate Bikin Ucup Kepepet (Inline Skate makes Ucup Trapped)
 Surat dari Si Mbok Bikin Sopo Mabuk (Message from Grandmother makes Sopo drunk)
 Bisnis Katering Bikin Merinding (Catering Business make Goosebumps)
 Kakek Dijemput Jadi Semrawut (Father Picked Up So Messy)
 Adit Jatuh Bunda Luluh (Adit Fall, Mother dissolved)
 Latihan Pentas Seni Bikin Hepi (Art Performances make everyone happy)
 Ucup Terbang Semua Bimbang (Ucup Flying, All Uncertain)
 Jangan Kaget Denis Bermain Basket (Don't Be Shocking, Dennis Playing Basketball)
 Jarwo Senang Pak Anas Puas (Jarwo Happy, Pak Anas Satisfied)
 Bulutangkis Bikin Dennis Meringis (Badminton Makes Dennis Grimace)
 Bazar Bersama Untuk Peduli Sesama (Bazaar Together for care to each other)
 Festival Perahu Kertas Berlayar Tanpa Batas (Festival of Paper Boats Sail Indefinitely)
 Lomba Mancing Ada Yang Pusing (The Fishing Competition is Dizzy)
 Serba Gak Bisa Malah Jadi Bisa (All Cannot, so it can)
 Celengan Hilang Jarwo Senang (Lost Piggy Bank, Jarwo Happy)
 Jarwo Datang Semua Senang (Jarwo Coming, All Happy)
 Jebakan Untuk Kebaikan (Trap For Goodness)
 Dennis Sakit Sampai Nyelekit (Dennis hurt to a great Extent)
 Ucup Suka Sanip Cinta (Ucup Like, Sanip Loved)
 Hias Bemo Bareng Bang Ringgo (Decorate Bemo with Ringgo)
 Gara-Gara Adu Kuat Jadi Cepat (Because of Strong So Fast)
 Peci Hilang Ucup Meriang (The Lost Cap, Ucup Dizzy)
 Ucup Dimana Sanip Merana (Where's Ucup, Sanip Languish)
 Senandung Angklung Warga Pun Kagum (The Hums of Angklung Citizens amazed)
 Beda Generasi Harus Tetap Serasi (Same Generation was Compatible)
 Sebuah Jasa Yang Tak Disangka (The Unexpected Service)
 Kejutan Warna Warni (Colorful Surprise)
 Mobil Kayu Lancar Melaju (Wooden Car Run Smoothly)
 Jarwo Diskor Sopo Pecahkan Rekor (Jarwo On Score, Sopo Break Record)
 Tamu istimewa penyelamat generasi bangsa (Special Guest Savior of nation's generation)
 Mencari Guru membuat hati rindu (Serach the teacher makes heart Longing)
 Rujak mangga bikin jadi bangga (Mango salad makes proud)
 Doa dulu supaya berkah selalu (Let's Pray always hopefully)
 Pahlawan Tak Terduga Semua Lega (Hero Unexpected all relived)
 Aksi Cuci Jadi Kunci (Cleaning action to be the key)
 Latihan Sepakbola Supaya Menang Laga (Football exercise in order Win to match)
 Kekurangan Tak Boleh Jadi Halangan (Lack should not to be obstacle)
 Pantang Mengeluh Jadilah Tangguh (Never Complaining be tough)
 Burung Kakatua Bikin Curiga (Kakatua bird makes suspicious)
 Biar Mati Lampu Tetap Seru (Let The light off Still Exciting)
 Asyiknya Mamat Jualan Tomat
 Ada Nanas Mangga Pak Anas Cemas (There is a pineapple Pak Anas anxious)
 Uang Hilang Semua Bimbang (The Lost Money, All Uncertain)
 Amanah Untuk Kampung Berkah (Trustworthy for Kampung Berkah)
 Jarwo Sakit Jadinya Terasa Sulit (Jarwo hurts to be difficult)
 Kang Ujang Loyo Rame-rame Bikin Bakso
 Dari Sampah Jadi Berkah (From Garbage become blessing)
 Indahnya Berbagi Bikin Senang Hati (The beauty of Sharing makes Happy)
 Satu Malam Makin Mencekam (One night more gripping)
 Jago Silat Lawan Penjahat (Martial Against Prison)
 Semua Tulus Insya Allah Bagus (All Sincere Insya Allah Good)
 Bareng Pak Anas Kita Ke Monas (With Pak Anas, Goes To Monas)
 Rejeki Nomplok Bikin Kapok (windfall makes you give up)
 Biarpun Hewan Kami Sebagai Kawan (As The Animals, we are the friends)
 Indahnya Toleransi Bikin Hati Berseri (The Beauty Of Tolerance, makes radiant heart)
 Jarwo Melihat Warna Adit Merana (Jarwo Look the color, Adit Languish)
 Makanan Sehat Bikin Badan Kuat (Healthy Food makes Strong Body)
 Kejutan Seru Bikin Haru (Exciting surprise makes emotion)
 Balap Kelomang Bikin Takut Bukan Kepalang (Hermit crabs races makes scary not terrified)
 Gelembung Sabun Bikin Melambung (Soap Bubble makes soar)
 Burung Perkutut Bikin Kalut (Turtledoves makes Chaos)
 Kue Keranjang Bikin Kejengkang (Basket cakes makes cramp)
 Ondel Ondel Bikin Jengkel (Ondel Ondel makes annoyed)
 Ucup Nemu Dompet Semua Mepet (Ucup found the wallet, all close)
 Bareng Raksasa Adel Senang (With Giants, Adel Happy)
 Susu Kacang Bikin Terguncang (Soy Milk makes shaken)
 Gara-Gara Semut Jarwo Merenggut (Because the ants, Jarwo Snatch)
 Melatih Satwa Bikin Ketawa (Teaching the Animals makes Laughing)
 Punya Tenaga Besar Bukan Berarti Kekar (Got the Big Power, Not be stocky)
 Pembasmi Nyamuk Jangan Diamuk (Mosquito Exterminator don't be rage)
 Kalau Sabar, Rezeki Tak Terhindar (If Patient, Sustenance are not Inevitable)
 Bersyukur Jangan Tersungkur (Be Grateful, Don't you fall)
 Pantang Pegel Kalau Gagal (Don't be Stiff If You Fail)
 Dua Raga Satu Jiwa (Two bodies, One Soul)
 Bahagia Bersama Itu Sempurna (Happiness Together It is Complete)
 Anak Indonesia Membangun Bangsa (Indonesian Child Build the Nation)
 Kecil-Kecil Mimpi Besar (Small but big dream)
 Sepeda bisa jadi Faedah (Bicycle to be a Benefit)
 Badan Tua Jiwa Muda (The Old Body, The Young Soul)
 Habis Ronda Tetap Terjaga (Finished Patrol, Stay Awake)
 Bangga Punya Rasa Cinta (Proud to be a Love)
 Kemah Depan Rumah Bikin Meriah (Camp in the front of house Makes Happy)
 Naik Delman Semua Aman (Ride a Wagon All Safety)
 Dapat Amanat Harus Diingat (Got The Trust, Must be Remember)
 Dennis Mengkhayal Jarwo Terjungkal (Dennis Daydreaming, Jarwo Fall Over)
 Lestarikan Wayang Jangan Melayang (Save the Puppet, don't be float)
 Bermain Panah Tak Boleh Lengah (Playing the Arrow, Don't be Careless)
 Si Belang Cemburu, Bang Jarwo Diburu (Si Belang Jealousy, Jarwo was Hunted)
 Karung Bolong Jangan Sombong (Empty Sack Don't be Arrogant)
 Cari Resep Donat Jarwo Kependat
 Walaupun Tak Baru Bikin Seru (Although Not New Makes Excitement)
 Asiknya Bikin Ketupat Semua Merapat (The Fun Makes Ketupat, All Closely)
 Adel Lucu Main Salju (The Fun Of Adel Playing Snow)
 Punya Aquarium Bikin Adel Tersenyum (Got The Aquarium makes Adel Smile)
 Ban Sepeda Lepas Bikin Ucup Terhempas (The Loose Bicycle Tires, Ucup Blown Away)
 Penglihatan Pudar, Semua Bubar (The Faded Vision, All Disbanded)
 Dapat Upah Segera Sedekah (Got the wage, Get Alms Soon)
 Sehat Berkat Keringat (Healthy Because the Sweat)
 Film Mantap di Layar Tancap (Great Movie on Stick Screen)
 Ceroboh Bikin Heboh (Careless makes Excited)
 Adel Ke Bulan Semua Heran (Adel Go To The Moon, All Wonder)
 Gemar Membaca Banyak Taunya (Love To Read A Lot)
 Ada Ubi Ada Talas (There's a Cassava, There's a Taro)
 Kabar Palsu Bikin Isu (The Fake News Make Issue)
 Tut..tut..tut Siapa Mau Ikut (Tut...tut....tut... Who Wants to Come)
 Bermain Ala Haji Udin (Playing with Haji Udin)
 Bukan Jagoan Kalau Nggak Berantem (Not A Hero If You Don't Fight)
 Menanam Dengan Senyuman (Planting With a Smile) 
 Ulat Bulu Terlihat Lucu (Caterpillars look cute)
 Bermain dengan Ragam Alam (Playing with Nature)
 Kerja bakti jangan sendiri (Community Service don't be Alone)
 Ingin Pepaya Malah Apa Daya (Wants Papaya, But What the Power)
 Coba Pesan Antar Malah Ambyar (Try To Delivery Order But Even Shattered)

Awards and nominations 
The animated series were receiving six nominations in any awards ceremonies, such as Nickelodeon Indonesia Kids' Choice Awards for Favorite Cartoon and Panasonic Gobel Awards for Favorite Children & Animation Program. In 2014, Adit & Sopo Jarwo episodes "Ojek Payung Bikin Bingung" winning Best Short Films at the 2014 Anti Corruption Film Festival and nominated for Best Animation Film at the 2014 Indonesian Film Festival.

In 2017, the animated television had first time to win trophy award for Favorite Children and Animation Program at the 20th Annual Panasonic Gobel Awards.

Sponsorships 
 Unifam
 Kalbe Farma
 Garudafood
 Nano-nano Milky
 Vivo Smartphone
 Tokopedia
 Cap Lang Kayu Putih Aroma
 Teh Kotak
 Sasa

Trivia 
 The story of Adit Sopo Jarwo was inspired by Islamic-themed Sinetrons which was broadcast by RCTI, SCTV, & Indosiar.

Broadcast

References

External links 
 
 
 
 
 
 
Animal Workshop

2010s Indonesian television series
2014 Indonesian television series debuts
2010s animated television series
MNCTV original programming
Indonesian children's animated television series
Indonesian children's animated comedy television series
Indonesian children's animated adventure television series
Animated television series about children